Hedong is an urban district of the city of Linyi, Shandong province, China. As the name implies, it is located east of the Yi River from the other two districts of Linyi, Lanshan and Luozhuang.

Administrative divisions
As 2012, this district is divided to 7 subdistricts, 4 towns and 1 township.
Subdistricts

Towns

Townships
Liudianzi Township

References

External links 
 Information page

County-level divisions of Shandong
Linyi